Nevanka is a village in Chunsky District of Irkutsk Oblast, Russia. It lies on the Chuna River.

References

External links
Maplandia

Rural localities in Irkutsk Oblast